Altınpınar can refer to:

 Altınpınar, Düzce
 Altınpınar, Hınıs